Charles Glen MacAndrew, 1st Baron MacAndrew,  (13 January 1888 – 11 January 1979) was a Scottish Unionist politician.

Born in Ayrshire, he was educated at Uppingham School and at Trinity College, Cambridge.

MacAndrew was elected at the 1924 general election as Member of Parliament (MP) for the Kilmarnock constituency in Ayrshire, and held the seat until his defeat at the 1929 general election. He stood unsuccessfully in the Kilmarnock by-election in November 1929, but was returned to the House of Commons at the 1931 general election for Glasgow Partick, and in 1935 for Bute and Northern Ayrshire, holding that seat until he retired from the Commons in 1959.

He was Deputy Chairman of Ways and Means, House of Commons, from May to July 1945 and from March 1950 to October 1951, and a Deputy Speaker of the House of Commons and Chairman of Ways and Means from 1951 to 1959.

He commanded the Ayrshire Yeomanry from 1932 to 1936 and was Honorary Colonel from 1951 to 1955.
He was knighted in the King's Birthday Honours List 1935, appointed a Privy Counsellor in 1952 and was raised to the peerage as Baron MacAndrew in 1959.

References

External links 
 

1888 births
1979 deaths
Anglo-Scots
Deputy Lieutenants of Ayrshire
Members of the Privy Council of the United Kingdom
Knights Bachelor
Unionist Party (Scotland) MPs
Alumni of Trinity College, Cambridge
Members of the Parliament of the United Kingdom for Glasgow constituencies
UK MPs 1924–1929
UK MPs 1931–1935
UK MPs 1935–1945
UK MPs 1945–1950
UK MPs 1950–1951
UK MPs 1951–1955
UK MPs 1955–1959
UK MPs who were granted peerages
Ayrshire (Earl of Carrick's Own) Yeomanry officers
Hereditary barons created by Elizabeth II